Kim Allen may refer to:
 Kim Allen (baseball) (born 1953), former American baseball player
 Kim Allen (actress) (born 1982), American actress